Tacony station is a SEPTA Regional Rail station in Philadelphia, Pennsylvania. Located at Disston and Keystone Streets in the Tacony neighborhood of Northeast Philadelphia, it serves the Trenton Line. It is 12.1 track miles (19.5 km) from Suburban Station. In 2004, this station saw 131 boardings on an average weekday. Amtrak does not stop at this station.

Station layout

References

External links
 Current schedule for the SEPTA Trenton Line
 SEPTA station page for Tacony

SEPTA Regional Rail stations
Former Pennsylvania Railroad stations
Stations on the Northeast Corridor